All Hallows High School (formerly known as the All Hallows Institute) is a Catholic boys' high school in the South Bronx, New York, United States. Located at 111 East 164th Street, near Yankee Stadium, the school has an enrollment of approximately 574 boys, 99% of whom are persons of color.

Despite sitting in the poorest Congressional district in the country, All Hallows routinely places its entire graduating class in four-year colleges. The Wall Street Journal has called the school's success in this area "stunning". The Acton Institute has named All Hallows as one of the top-50 Catholic high schools in the United States for nine consecutive years.  It is located within the Roman Catholic Archdiocese of New York and is the only city school in the archdiocese to have earned this distinction.

History and philosophy

All Hallows was founded in 1909 by the Congregation of Christian Brothers at the invitation and with the help of Monsignor James Power, pastor of All Saints Church.
The order founded the school upon the principles of Blessed Edmund Rice, which center on providing moral and scholastic training, especially to the children of the poor. The first staff included the Superior Brother P. J. Ryan, and Brothers J.A. Kelly, M.S. Curtis, and P.G. Molloy.  Originally located at 13-15 West 124th in Manhattan, the school moved to its current location in 1929. The school has more than 10,000 graduates.

All Hallows was the first school founded by the Christian Brothers in the United States. For much of its history, All Hallows was an elementary school as well as a high school, but it has been exclusively the latter since 1977.

When All Hallows was established in 1909 the school seal was carefully chosen by the Brother from Ireland.
The American Eagle at the center of the seal represents the All Hallows Community's commitment to the United States. The wreath of laurel surrounding the seal refers to victory and achievement in both athletics and scholastics. The circle surrounding the eagle serves a reminder of the school's "continuing faith" and the four corners of the seal are represented by the Gaelic symbol for the continuation of life. The Latin phrase Pro fide et patria means For faith and country.

All Hallows celebrated its centennial in 2009 and was honored with its own street name change to All Hallows Way as a parting gift from the Class of 2012. The school was also visited by Mary McAleese, the former president of Ireland, during the 2012–2013 school year.

In 2019, Susan Natale was appointed the first female principal of All Hallows High School.

Sports and activities

All Hallows students participate in more than 40 sports and activities; these include the All Hallows Players (the Drama Club, noted for its Shakespeare productions), the newspaper (The Blue and White), the chess team, Big Brothers, as well as "El Club Latino". Students also have various opportunities to join clubs such as student government, the Sports Bowl, the Montefiore Medical Center Program, and intramural sports (football, dodge ball, basketball, etc.).

All Hallows has a much decorated history with athletic awards all across the senior hallway and the lobby. The ore recent string of accomplishments began in Spring 2006, when the varsity baseball team won a Catholic High School Athletic Association (CHSAA) championship, and, in Winter 2007, when the Freshmen basketball team also won a CHSAA championship. The All Hallows J.V. Bowling team won the CHSAA division championship in 2011 for the second straight year. All Hallows has twice been the Bronx champions on the televised team academic game show "The Challenge" on MSG Varsity (2009 and 2012).

The teams are called The Gaels, although the mascot-emblem looks more like a leprechaun wielding a shillelagh.

The All Hallows Foundation
In 1997, graduates of the school set up The All Hallows Foundation, a 501(C)(3) organized for the purpose of supporting the school and the surrounding neighborhood. The board of directors for the All Hallows Foundation is composed primarily of All Hallows graduates who have achieved notable success in fields such as finance, technology, law, and television.

The Foundation provides funds for a scholarship fund that allows talented, but impoverished young men to attend All Hallows. It also supports facility renovations and improvements, a faculty endowment and community outreach programs. Philip J. Eagan, the board chairman of the All Hallows Foundation applies his background in finance to bring "a bold, entrepreneurial, and creative approach to inner city education."

In December 2006, the Foundation received an anonymously donated check for $2 million. The donation was made by a graduate of the school.

Demographics 

*Estimate

Notable alumni
 Stephen Alemais, professional baseball player
 Bobby Cremins, longtime NCAA Men's Basketball Coach (Appalachian State, Georgia Tech, College of Charleston)
 James B. Donovan, lawyer and negotiator involved in the 1960 U-2 incident
 Dan Dorion, professional hockey player
 James Norwood, professional baseball player
 Olden Polynice, professional basketball player
 Shawnelle Scott, professional basketball player
 RaShawn Stores, college basketball coach for Manhattan College
 Jim White, professional football player

References

External links
 All Hallows High School website

Congregation of Christian Brothers secondary schools
Educational institutions established in 1909
Boys' schools in New York City
Roman Catholic high schools in the Bronx
1909 establishments in New York City